The 71st Infantry Division was a division of the Philippine Army under the United States Army Forces in the Far East (USAFFE).

Organization

History
It was active from 1941 to April 9, 1942, whereupon it surrendered when Bataan fell.  Previously it was active in Southern Luzon.  Col. (later BGen.) Clyde A. Selleck (USA), a 1910 U.S. Military Academy graduate, was the division's commander until January 1942, when BGen. Clinton A. Pierce (USA) took command.  Pierce had previously been in command of the U.S. 26th Cavalry Regt. (PS) since before the Japanese opened hostilities. Col. Salvador F. Reyes (PA), a 1917 U.S. Military Academy graduate, was the division's chief of staff.

Combat Narrative
After the Japanese invasion of the Philippines in December 1941, it formed part of South Luzon Force (activated December 13, 1941) under BGen. George M. Parker Jr., HQ Ft. McKinley, Manila. East and south of Manila were under the control of the South Luzon Force. In the beginning, Parker was accompanied by the PA 1st, 41st, 51st, and 71st Infantry Divisions as well as the 2nd Provisional Artillery Group, which consisted of two U.S. 86th Field Artillery Regiment (Philippine Scouts).

When the Japanese began landing at Lamon Bay on December 24, 1941, South Luzon Force was badly dispersed.

Order of battle

 71st Infantry Regiment (PA) (LCol. D. Van N. Bonnett) 
 72nd Infantry Regiment (PA) (Col. Virgil N. Cordero, Inf.) (moved from Negros to Luzon on 9 Dec 41)
 73rd Infantry Regiment (PA) (remained on Negros island) 
 71st Field Artillery Regiment (PA) (LCol. Halstead C. Fowler) 
 71st FA Regt HQ Company 
 1st Bn/71st FA Regt (PA) (75mm guns, 8x) 
 2nd Bn/71st FA Regt (PA) (2.95-inch pack howitzers, 12x) 
 3rd Bn/71st FA Regt (PA) 
 71st Engineer Battalion (PA) 
 71st Division Units
 71st Division Headquarters & HQ Company 
 71st Medical Battalion 
 71st Signal Company
 71st Quartermaster Company (Motorized)
 71st QM Transport Company (Truck)

Sources

Bibliography
Morton, Louis. The Fall of the Philippines (Publication 5-2) . Retrieved on 14 Feb 2017.

References

Infantry divisions of the Philippines
Military units and formations of the Philippine Army in World War II
Military units and formations established in 1941
Military units and formations disestablished in 1942